Ögmundur Kristinsson (born 19 June 1989) is an Icelandic professional footballer who plays as a goalkeeper for Greek Super League club Olympiacos and the Iceland national team.

Club career

Fram
Ögmundur made his senior debut for Fram on 12 June 2006, a week before his 17th birthday, in the 2006 season of the Icelandic second tier, starting against Haukar in the absence of Gunnar Sigurðsson. He kept a clean sheet in a 3–0 away win. His next match came in the 2009 Icelandic Premier League season in the last match of the season, entering as a half-time substitute for Hannes Þór Halldórsson and keeping a clean sheet in the second half as Fram lost 1–0 to Þróttur R. at home. He remained a reserve goalkeeper to Hannes Þór Halldórsson in the 2010 season. When Hannes transferred to KR after the 2010 season Ögmundur became the main goalkeeper for Fram. He has played every league game since the start of the 2011 season.

On 30 December 2011, Ögmundur was given the honorary title "Fram Sportsman of the Year", the first footballer to hold that title.

Trials abroad and Randers
After the 2013 season he went on a trial to Norwegian club Sandnes Ulf and Scottish club Motherwell FC. His trial at Motherwell went well, although they were not looking to buy a goalkeeper at that time.

On 16 July 2014, half-way through the Icelandic 2014 season, Ögmundur joined Danish club Randers, signing a one-year contract. During the 2014–15 Superliga season, Ögmundur only made four league appearances while mostly acting as a back-up to Karl-Johan Johnsson.

Hammarby
On 2 June 2015 Ögmundur signed a 3-year deal with Hammarby IF, eventually making 15 appearances in the 2015 Allsvenskan for his new side. Ögmundur replaced Johannes Hopf as Hammarby's first choice goalkeeper halfway through the season, after the latter chose to make a move abroad.

In 2016, he scored his first competitive goal in his senior career when he scored the deciding penalty in the Swedish Cup semifinal against local rivals AIK. Ögmundur played all 30 league games as Hammarby finished 11th in the table, keeping 7 clean sheets throughout the year.

He started the 2017 season as Hammarby's starting goalkeeper, under the reign of new manager Jakob Michelsen. Ögmundur was criticized by the latter in May 2017 after several weak performances. In late July the same year, Hammarby brought in Johan Wiland from reigning champions Malmö FF. Ögmundur was deemed surplus to requirements after the new acquisition.

Excelsior
On 31 August 2017, Ögmundur transferred to Excelsior of the Eredivisie. He reportedly moved on a free, and signed a one year-deal (with an option for a further) with the Dutch club.

AEL
On 2 August 2018, Greek Superleague club AEL officially announced the signing of Kristinsson on a two-year deal.

On 26 February 2020, he signed a two-year contract extension.

Olympiacos
On 7 July 2020, Kristinsson signed a three years' contract with Greek Superleague club Olympiacos for a transfer fee of €400.000 from AEL.

International career
Ögmundur made his first international appearance on 4 June 2014 in a match against Estonia, when he came on as a substitute for Gunnleifur Gunnleifsson at half-time. In that second half, he kept a clean sheet, to maintain Iceland's 1–0 lead.

On 13 October 2015, Ögmundur made his competitive debut in a UEFA Euro 2016 qualifying game against Turkey, with Iceland already being qualified for the championship. Despite putting on a solid effort, Iceland went on to lose with the score of 1–0 after a free kick goal by Selçuk İnan in the 89th minute.

He was selected for EURO 2016.

Played on China Cup 2017, where Iceland won silver medals

Personal life
Ögmundur has a bachelor of law and has stated that he wishes to become a lawyer after his football career.

His favourite team is Manchester United whose former Danish goalkeeper Peter Schmeichel was his childhood hero.

On 9 July 2021, it was made known that he and his wife export wines from Greece to Iceland.

Career statistics

Club

Honours

Fram
First Division (Second tier): 2006
Icelandic Cup: 2013
Olympiacos
Super League Greece: 2020–21, 2021–22

References

External links
 
 
 

1989 births
Living people
Ogmundur Kristinsson
Ogmundur Kristinsson
Ogmundur Kristinsson
Ogmundur Kristinsson
Ogmundur Kristinsson
Ogmundur Kristinsson
Randers FC players
Hammarby Fotboll players
Excelsior Rotterdam players
Athlitiki Enosi Larissa F.C. players
Olympiacos F.C. players
Ogmundur Kristinsson
Ogmundur Kristinsson
Danish Superliga players
Allsvenskan players
Eredivisie players
Super League Greece players
Association football goalkeepers
Expatriate men's footballers in Denmark
Expatriate footballers in Sweden
Expatriate footballers in the Netherlands
Expatriate footballers in Greece
Ogmundur Kristinsson
Ogmundur Kristinsson
Ogmundur Kristinsson
Ogmundur Kristinsson
UEFA Euro 2016 players